A by-election was held for the New South Wales Legislative Assembly electorate of Morpeth on 18 September 1862 because David Buchanan was insolvent and resigned his seat. Buchanan had unsuccessfully sued the Sydney Morning Herald for libel and was required to pay their legal costs. He was unable to pay and declared himself bankrupt.

Dates

Polling places

Result

David Buchanan was insolvent and resigned.

See also
Electoral results for the district of Morpeth
List of New South Wales state by-elections

References

1862 elections in Australia
New South Wales state by-elections
1860s in New South Wales